Jacques Andrieux (15 August 1917 – 21 January 2005) was a French fighter ace of the Second World War credited with 6 aerial victories.

Early life
Jacques Andrieux was the son of a military doctor, who was deported to Germany as a Résistant and died in captivity.

According to some sources, Andrieux joined the French air force as a non-commissioned officer in 1937. Others contend that he was simply a private pilot and was drafted in the air force at the beginning of the war.

At the time of the invasion of France, Andrieux was not an active pilot and did not take part in the fighting. Demobilised in August 1940, he fled on a fishing boat from Brittany to Great-Britain on 16 December 1940 and joined the Free French Air Force.

Wartime service
Posted to Odiham as a trainee Sergeant pilot, after training he was assigned to No. 130 Squadron in September 1941, flying Spitfires. He achieved his first aerial victory by downing a Fw 190 near Cherbourg 28 February 1943.

Promoted to Lieutenant in 1943, he was posted to No. 91 Squadron in April 1943 and shot down three more German fighters with this unit.

In June 1944 he joined No. 341 Squadron, also known in French as Groupe de Chasse n° 3/2 "Alsace", with the rank of captain. On 26 August 1944 he took command of the unit when Jacques-Henri Schloesing was killed in combat. During this period he destroyed another two German fighters, thus becoming a fighter ace.

He ended the war with the rank of Wing Commander commanding 80 Operational Training Unit at RAF Ouston. His final claim total was 6 destroyed, 4 'probables' and 2 damaged.

Postwar service
After the war, he continued a career in the French air force. He commanded a fighter training unit in Meknès, Morocco until 1950. He then took command of the 2e Escadre de Chasse in Dijon, France, and later of the 4e Brigade aérienne in Bremgarten, Germany.

He also commanded the 12e Escadre de Chasse in Cambrai.

He retired in 1970 with the rank of général de brigade aérienne and held various civilian positions.

He died on 21 January 2005 in Saint-Georges-de-Didonne where he was buried.

Medals and awards
 Grand Croix of the French Légion d'Honneur
 Compagnon de la Libération
 Grand Croix of the Ordre National du Mérite
 Croix de Guerre 1939-45 with 13 citations
 Croix de la Valeur Militaire with two citations
 Médaille de l'Aéronautique
 Chevalier du Mérite agricole
 Distinguished Flying Cross with Bar (UK)
 Silver Star (USA)

Writings
 Jacques Andrieux, Le ciel et l'enfer, Presses de la Cité, 1965
 Jacques Andrieux, Une poignée d'as

References

Bibliography
 Thierry Le Roy, Les Bretons et l'aéronautique des origines à 1939, Presses universitaires de Rennes, 2002.

External links 
  (in French)
 http://www.thisisplymouth.co.uk/Rare-archive-footage-reveals-heroes/story-11508208-detail/story.html

French Air and Space Force personnel
French World War II pilots
Free French military personnel of World War II
1917 births
2005 deaths
military personnel from Lorient
Grand Croix of the Légion d'honneur
Recipients of the Croix de Guerre 1939–1945 (France)
Companions of the Liberation
Grand Cross of the Ordre national du Mérite
Recipients of the Cross for Military Valour
Recipients of the Aeronautical Medal
Recipients of the Distinguished Service Cross (United Kingdom)
Recipients of the Silver Star